Nicholas Ennis (1815– 27 May 1881) was an Irish Home Rule League politician.

He was elected as on eof the two Members of Parliament (MPs) for Meath in 1874, but did not stand at the next election in 1880.

References

External links
 

UK MPs 1874–1880
1815 births
1881 deaths
Home Rule League MPs
Members of the Parliament of the United Kingdom for County Meath constituencies (1801–1922)